Polybioides is a genus of paper wasp of the sub-family Polistinae which contains six species which are found in the Neotropical, Afrotropical and Indomalayan zoogeographic regions.

Species 
Polybioides angustus Vecht, 1966
Polybioides gracilis Vecht, 1966
Polybioides melaina (Meade-Waldo, 1911)
Polybioides psecas R. du Buysson, 1913
Polybioides raphigastra (Saussure, 1854)
Polybioides tabidus (Fabricius, 1781)

References

Vespidae